Ituzaingó may refer to:
 Ituzaingó, Buenos Aires, a city in Argentina
 Ituzaingó, Corrientes, a city in Argentina
 Ituzaingó, Montevideo, a barrio of Montevideo, Uruguay
 Ituzaingó, Uruguay, a town of San José, Uruguay
 Ituzaingó Department, a department of the province of Corrientes in Argentina
 Battle of Ituzaingó, a battle fought in 1827 in the vicinity of the Santa Maria river, southern Brazil
 Club Atlético Ituzaingó, Argentine football club based in Ituzaingó, Buenos Aires